Ihor Isichenko (Ukrainian: Ігор Ісіченко; from his birth name Юрій Андрійович Ісіченко, Yuriy Andriïovych Issitchenko), (born on January 28, 1956, in Bashkiria), is a former Ukraine Orthodox archbishop, who converted to Catholicism in 2020.

Biography
 
Ihor Isichenko was Archbishop of the Diocese of Kharkiv - Poltava (north-eastern Ukraine) between 1993 and 2020, first for the Ukrainian Autocephalous Orthodox Church and then for the Orthodox Church of Ukraine. He is professor emeritus at the National University of Kharkiv, specialist in medieval literature and in relations between Catholics and Orthodoxes.

In 2020, Isichenko converted to Catholicism and joined, together with his diocese, the Ukrainian Greek Catholic Church.

In 2022, he retired with the title of Archbishop Emeritus,
and went to work within the Ukrainian Catholic University. He was made an honorary doctor of this university on July 9, 2022.

Awards
 
 Order "For Intellectual Courage" (2008)

Main publications

 Isichenko Yu. A. Kyiv-Pechersk paterik in the literary process of the late 16th and early 18th centuries. in Ukraine. — K.: Nauk. dumka, 1990. — 180 p.
 Ihor Isichenko, archbishop. History of the Church of Christ in Ukraine: Synopsis of lectures for students of theological schools. — Kharkiv, 1999. — 265 p.
 Ihor Isichenko, archbishop. Ascetic literature of Kievan Rus. - Kharkiv: Akta, 2005. - 374 p.
 Ihor Isichenko, archbishop. Conversations on the edge of millennia. — Kharkiv-Lviv, 2008.
 Ihor Isichenko, archbishop. History of Ukrainian literature: the Baroque era of the XVII-XVIII centuries. : [learning manual for university students]; National Kyiv-Mohylyan University. Acad.". — Lviv; Kyiv ; Kharkiv: Svyatogorets, 2011. — 566, [1] p. — Bibliography: pp. 551-567 and in the subsection. approx. UDC : 821.161.2.09”16/17”(091)(075.8).
 Ihor Isichenko, archbishop. Encounters on Life's Path: A Popular Catechism for Young People. – Lviv; Kharkiv: Svyatogorets, 2013. – 144 p.
 Ihor Isichenko, archbishop. Watch over the lamp: The message. Reports. Articles. – Kharkiv; Lviv: Svyatogorets, 2013. – 416 p.
 Ihor Isichenko, archbishop. General church history: Textbook for higher theological schools. — Kharkiv: Akta, 2014. — 601 p .
 Ihor Isichenko, archbishop. Ancient Egyptian monasticism. — Kharkiv: Akta, 2014. — 214 p.
 Ihor Isichenko, archbishop. History of the Church of Christ in Ukraine. — Kharkiv: Akta, 2014. — 760 p .
 Ihor Isichenko, archbishop. Ascetic literature of Kievan Rus. — Kharkiv: Akta, 2014. — 386 p. BBK : Sh43(4UKR)(=411.1){4}”X - XVIII century.”*401+ Sh43(4UKR)(=411.1){4}”X - XVIII century.”*414.2+ E37-438-341
 Ihor Isichenko, archbishop. Kyiv-Pechersk paterik in the literary process of the late 16th - early 18th centuries. in Ukraine. - 2nd edition. - Kharkiv: Akta, 2015. - 248 p.
 Ihor Isichenko, archbishop. Spiritual dimensions of the baroque text: Literary studies. - Kharkiv: Akta, 2016. - 580 p.
 Ihor Isichenko, archbishop. War of baroque metaphors. Petr Mohyla's "Stone" against Kasiyan Sakovich's "Spyglass". - Kharkiv: Akta, 2017. - 348 p.
 Ihor Isichenko, archbishop. On the rock of the Word: Sermons on Sundays and transitional holidays (2011-2015). – Lviv: Svichado, 2017. – 440 p.
 Ihor Isichenko, archbishop. We were just walking: Memories. - Kharkiv: Akta, 2018. - 598; [14] with ISBN 978-966-8917-27-1.

References

External Links

 Особистий сайт архієпископа Ігоря (Ісіченка) 
 Сайт газети «Наша віра» 
 Харківсько-Полтавська єпархія УАПЦ (архив)
 Заява архиєпископа Ігоря про зречення архиєрейського уряду 
 Владика Ігор Ісіченко отримав почесне звання доктора Honoris Causa УКУ

1956 births
Bishops of the Ukrainian Greek Catholic Church
Converts to Eastern Catholicism from Eastern Orthodoxy
Former Ukrainian Orthodox Christians
Living people